The 2015 Torneo del Inca is the third season of the Torneo del Inca, the first football tournament of the 2015 season of Peruvian football. All 17 teams of the first division compete in this tournament and the winner of the tournament advances to the playoffs of the 2015 Torneo Descentralizado.

Teams

Stadia and locations

Draw
The 17 teams were organized into four pots based on historical influence and geographic regions and were to be drawn into the three groups. The first pot contained the Big 3, the second and third pots contained teams which play in cities that are substantially above sea level, and the final pot contained the remaining teams which were not part of the first three pots.

Group stage

Group A

Group B

Group C

Ranking of second place teams
The second place teams will be ranked based on points per game.

Final phase

Semi-finals
The semi-finals was played by the three group winners and the second place team with the best points-per-game average.

First leg

Second leg 

Tied 2-2 on aggregate. Universidad César Vallejo win 5-4 on penalties.

Final
The final was played in the Estadio Nacional in Lima.

See also
2015 Torneo Descentralizado
2015 Torneo de Promoción y Reserva

References

2015 domestic association football cups
2015 in Peruvian football leagues